Reagan Garth "Buddy" Turman (April 12, 1933 – April 1, 2007) was an American professional heavyweight boxer. He was born in the rural community of Noonday, Texas.

Boxing career
In his two years as an amateur in Texas, Turman accrued 20 wins five losses, and one draw, and he set a record for the quickest knockout in National AAU history.
 
Turman fought his first professional match in September 1954, (at age 21) against Bobby Babcock, which he won. Five months later, Turman became the first white man to legally fight an African-American in Texas thanks to the efforts of African-American I. H. "Sporty" Harvey, who had successfully challenged boxing segregation in court. Turman won the match against Harvey on February 24, 1955, and won a rematch in June 1955.

In November 1955, with 11 wins and one loss, Turman fought Roy "Cut-n-Shoot" Harris for the Texas Heavyweight Championship in Tyler, Texas. Turman lost the fight in a controversial decision, which allowed Harris to move on to fight Floyd Patterson for the World Heavyweight Title. This decision severely hampered Turman's chances of winning the World Title.

Two years later, with 25 wins and only 3 losses, Turman faced Oscar Pharo for a second time. In the third fight of his professional career, Turman had been beaten by a more experienced Pharo on points. In the rematch, Turman won on a KO within 59 seconds of the first round.

In May 1959, at Madison Square Garden, Turman soundly defeated Bob Cleroux, who a year later would win the Canadian Heavyweight Title. The next year, Turman faced World Light-Heavyweight Champion and World Heavyweight Contender, Archie Moore, in Dallas, Texas. Moore won by decision. However, Cassius Clay, who was in attendance, afterwards expressed to Turman his dismay at the judges' decision. Moore publicly acknowledged that Turman should be considered one of the top five heavyweights in the world. Turman subsequently spent time at Moore's training camp in San Diego, where Clay was also training.

Turman began fighting abroad in 1961, in Manila, Philippines where a rematch was scheduled with Moore. However, Moore postponed the fight by three weeks after Turman had already arrived. This left Turman badly out of practice by the time of the fight, as there were no local heavyweights to spar with. Moore won by unanimous decision. Turman subsequently fought in Italy, South Africa, Germany, and England. He won his last match, which he fought against Rudolf Nehring on December 15, 1967, in Munich, Germany.

Turman fought a total of 62 professional matches and won 45 of them including 32 KOs. He had friendships with several of the best known boxers of his time, including Henry Cooper, Jack Dempsey, Joe Louis, Billy Conn, and Rocky Marciano.

Outside the ring
By the late fifties, Turman enjoyed celebrity status in Texas, especially in Dallas and Tyler. However, to supplement his inadequate boxing income he had to take other jobs. After a fight in Dallas, he met Jack Ruby. They became friends and Turman began working off and on for him as a manager and bouncer at some of his Dallas night clubs. Turman was interviewed by the FBI soon after Ruby killed Lee Harvey Oswald in November 1963. Turman shared his opinions of Ruby and what he knew of Ruby's acquaintances in the Dallas Police Department.

Turman had married and had a son in Dallas in the late fifties, and Turman began to seek work in films and television to support the family. First, he made a cameo appearance on an episode of Westinghouse Desilu Playhouse (1958) with Lucille Ball and Aldo Ray, and a few years later he appeared as a regular guest on Hollywood Squares. He was also considered for various roles that never materialized (including the lead role in a proposed biopic about his friend Jack Dempsey). Turman's marriage was brief, but he and his ex-wife remained lifelong friends. They continued to share responsibility for raising their son. 
 
While living on the west coast, Turman befriended German boxer and wrestler Wilhelm von Homburg (who eventually had roles in several Hollywood films). Soon thereafter Turman began primarily fighting abroad. He spent much of the last two years of his career fighting on the same ticket as von Homberg throughout Germany. Von Homberg and Turman visited each other periodically and corresponded often in the following years. After von Homberg was diagnosed with cancer, he visited Turman for two weeks in Longview, Texas before going to Mexico where he died.

After Turman's boxing years, he held various jobs including oil lease agent in East Texas and bartender and security guard at Binion's Horseshoe in Las Vegas.

He died April 1, 2007, in Longview, Texas, of complications from Hepatitis C.

Professional boxing record

|-
|align="center" colspan=8|45 Wins (32 knockouts, 13 decisions), 15 Losses (4 knockouts, 9 decisions, 2 DQ), 2 Draws 
|-
| align="center" style="border-style: none none solid solid; background: #e3e3e3"|Result
| align="center" style="border-style: none none solid solid; background: #e3e3e3"|Record
| align="center" style="border-style: none none solid solid; background: #e3e3e3"|Opponent
| align="center" style="border-style: none none solid solid; background: #e3e3e3"|Type
| align="center" style="border-style: none none solid solid; background: #e3e3e3"|Round
| align="center" style="border-style: none none solid solid; background: #e3e3e3"|Date
| align="center" style="border-style: none none solid solid; background: #e3e3e3"|Location
| align="center" style="border-style: none none solid solid; background: #e3e3e3"|Notes
|-align=center
|Win
|
|align=left| Rudolf Nehring
|KO
|2
|15/12/1967
|align=left| Circus Krone, Munich, Bavaria
|align=left|
|-
|Win
|
|align=left| Manfred Ackers
|TKO
|4
|09/12/1966
|align=left| Festhalle Frankfurt, Frankfurt, Hesse
|align=left|
|-
|Win
|
|align=left| David E. Bailey
|TKO
|9
|15/04/1966
|align=left| Ernst Merck Halle, Hamburg
|align=left|
|-
|Loss
|
|align=left| Dante Cane
|PTS
|8
|10/03/1966
|align=left| Milan, Lombardy
|align=left|
|-
|Win
|
|align=left| Lars Olaf Norling
|TKO
|4
|28/05/1965
|align=left| Deutschlandhalle, Charlottenburg, Berlin
|align=left|
|-
|Loss
|
|align=left| Jack Bodell
|TKO
|4
|20/04/1965
|align=left| Wolverhampton Civic Hall, Wolverhampton, West Midlands
|align=left|
|-
|Loss
|
|align=left| Ivan Prebeg
|DQ
|5
|02/04/1965
|align=left| Stadthalle, Vienna
|align=left|
|-
|Win
|
|align=left| Carl Welschou
|TKO
|4
|06/03/1965
|align=left| Neue Sporthalle, Hannover, Lower Saxony
|align=left|
|-
|Win
|
|align=left| Ray Cillien
|KO
|2
|13/02/1965
|align=left| Ernst Merck Halle, Hamburg
|align=left|
|-
|Loss
|
|align=left| Piero Tomasoni
|PTS
|10
|05/02/1965
|align=left| Milan, Lombardy
|align=left|
|-
|Win
|
|align=left| Manfred Ackers
|TKO
|4
|16/01/1965
|align=left| Westfalenhallen, Dortmund, North Rhine-Westphalia
|align=left|
|-
|Win
|
|align=left| Ulli Ritter
|TKO
|5
|14/11/1964
|align=left| Westfalenhallen, Dortmund, North Rhine-Westphalia
|align=left|
|-
|Loss
|
|align=left| Billy Lotter
|PTS
|10
|03/10/1964
|align=left| Caledonian Grounds, Pretoria, Gauteng
|align=left|
|-
|Win
|
|align=left| Dave Furch
|PTS
|10
|10/05/1964
|align=left| Las Vegas, Nevada
|align=left|
|-
|Win
|
|align=left| Sam Pride
|UD
|10
|05/02/1964
|align=left| Utah State Fair, Salt Lake City, Utah
|align=left|
|-
|Draw
|
|align=left| George Johnson
|PTS
|10
|05/11/1962
|align=left| Tyler, Texas
|align=left|
|-
|Loss
|
|align=left| Franco De Piccoli
|DQ
|2
|19/07/1962
|align=left| Rome, Lazio
|align=left|
|-
|Loss
|
|align=left| Pete Rademacher
|TKO
|9
|30/11/1961
|align=left| Fair Park Coliseum, Dallas, Texas
|align=left|
|-
|Loss
|
|align=left| Archie Moore
|UD
|10
|25/03/1961
|align=left| Araneta Coliseum, Quezon City, Metro Manila
|align=left|
|-
|Loss
|
|align=left| Archie Moore
|UD
|10
|28/11/1960
|align=left| Dallas Memorial Auditorium, Dallas, Texas
|align=left|
|-
|Loss
|
|align=left| Bob Cleroux
|KO
|2
|26/10/1960
|align=left| Montreal Forum, Montreal, Quebec
|align=left|
|-
|Win
|
|align=left| Sonny "Policeman" Moore
|MD
|10
|25/04/1960
|align=left| Dallas Memorial Auditorium, Dallas, Texas
|align=left|
|-
|Win
|
|align=left| Sonny "Policeman" Moore
|MD
|10
|21/03/1960
|align=left| Dallas Memorial Auditorium, Dallas, Texas
|align=left|
|-
|Win
|
|align=left| Tommy "Hurricane" Sims
|KO
|3
|01/03/1960
|align=left| Amarillo, Texas
|align=left|
|-
|Draw
|
|align=left| Donnie Fleeman
|PTS
|10
|02/11/1959
|align=left| Dallas, Texas
|align=left|
|-
|Win
|
|align=left| Tommy "Hurricane" Sims
|PTS
|10
|29/09/1959
|align=left| Tyler, Texas
|align=left|
|-
|Win
|
|align=left| Bob Cleroux
|PTS
|8
|29/05/1959
|align=left| Madison Square Garden, New York City
|align=left|
|-
|Win
|
|align=left| Bob Albright
|KO
|10
|05/05/1959
|align=left| Mike Carter Field, Tyler, Texas
|align=left|
|-
|Loss
|
|align=left| Bob Albright
|KO
|2
|21/03/1959
|align=left| Hollywood Legion Stadium, Hollywood, California
|align=left|
|-
|Win
|
|align=left| Billy Walters
|KO
|2
|27/01/1959
|align=left| Tyler, Texas
|align=left|
|-
|Loss
|
|align=left| Donnie Fleeman
|UD
|10
|30/06/1958
|align=left| Dallas Memorial Auditorium, Dallas, Texas
|align=left|
|-
|Win
|
|align=left| Jackie Jacobs
|KO
|1
|07/04/1958
|align=left| Dallas Sportatorium, Dallas, Texas
|align=left|
|-
|Win
|
|align=left| Dean Bogany
|KO
|3
|11/03/1958
|align=left| Tyler, Texas
|align=left|
|-
|Win
|
|align=left| "Chief" Alvin Williams
|PTS
|10
|28/01/1958
|align=left| Tyler, Texas
|align=left|
|-
|Win
|
|align=left| Oscar Pharo
|KO
|1
|17/12/1957
|align=left| Tyler, Texas
|align=left|
|-
|Win
|
|align=left| "Big" Ben Marshall
|KO
|2
|30/09/1957
|align=left| Tyler, Texas
|align=left|
|-
|Win
|
|align=left| Tommy Fields
|TKO
|8
|27/06/1957
|align=left| Dallas, Texas
|align=left|
|-
|Loss
|
|align=left| Art Swiden
|PTS
|10
|18/04/1957
|align=left| Dallas Sportatorium, Dallas, Texas
|align=left|
|-
|Win
|
|align=left| Jesse "Cannonball" Brown
|KO
|3
|04/03/1957
|align=left| Tyler, Texas
|align=left|
|-
|Win
|
|align=left|Otis Carr
|KO
|1
|31/01/1957
|align=left| Dallas, Texas
|align=left|
|-
|Win
|
|align=left|Haywood Crosser
|KO
|2
|21/01/1957
|align=left| Tyler, Texas
|align=left|
|-
|Win
|
|align=left| Ponce DeLeon Taylor
|KO
|4
|10/12/1956
|align=left| Ector County Coliseum, Odessa, Texas
|align=left|
|-
|Win
|
|align=left| Emil Brtko
|TKO
|3
|01/11/1956
|align=left| Dallas Sportatorium, Dallas, Texas
|align=left|
|-
|Win
|
|align=left| Felix Antonio
|KO
|4
|18/09/1956
|align=left| Lubbock, Texas
|align=left|
|-
|Win
|
|align=left| Felix Antonio
|KO
|5
|16/08/1956
|align=left| Dallas Sportatorium, Dallas, Texas
|align=left|
|-
|Win
|
|align=left| Soldier Paul Daniel
|KO
|2
|23/07/1956
|align=left| Tyler, Texas
|align=left|
|-
|Win
|
|align=left| Freddie Thompson
|KO
|2
|21/06/1956
|align=left| Dallas Sportatorium, Dallas, Texas
|align=left|
|-
|Win
|
|align=left| Dick Mays
|KO
|2
|03/05/1956
|align=left| Dallas Sportatorium, Dallas, Texas
|align=left|
|-
|Win
|
|align=left| Ranchero Alonzo
|TKO
|5
|29/03/1956
|align=left| Heart O' Texas Coliseum, Waco, Texas
|align=left|
|-
|Loss
|
|align=left| Roy Harris
|SD
|12
|28/11/1955
|align=left| Tyler, Texas
|align=left|
|-
|Win
|
|align=left| Alvin Green
|KO
|10
|07/11/1955
|align=left| Tyler, Texas
|align=left|
|-
|Win
|
|align=left| Alvin Green
|PTS
|10
|17/10/1955
|align=left| Tyler, Texas
|align=left|
|-
|Win
|
|align=left| Red Worley
|UD
|10
|18/08/1955
|align=left| Dallas Sportatorium, Dallas, Texas
|align=left|
|-
|Win
|
|align=left| Ponce DeLeon Taylor
|PTS
|10
|20/06/1955
|align=left| Tyler, Texas
|align=left|
|-
|Win
|
|align=left| JD Harvey
|PTS
|10
|03/06/1955
|align=left| Tyler, Texas
|align=left|
|-
|Win
|
|align=left| Leroy Failes
|KO
|4
|05/05/1955
|align=left| Beaumont, Texas
|align=left|
|-
|Win
|
|align=left| Jim Saddler
|KO
|2
|18/03/1955
|align=left| Tyler, Texas
|align=left|
|-
|Win
|
|align=left| JD Harvey
|UD
|10
|24/02/1955
|align=left| Dallas Sportatorium, Dallas, Texas
|align=left|
|-
|Win
|
|align=left| Buddy Babcock
|KO
|2
|10/02/1955
|align=left| Dallas Sportatorium, Dallas, Texas
|align=left|
|-
|Loss
|
|align=left| Oscar Pharo
|UD
|10
|13/01/1955
|align=left| Birmingham, Alabama
|align=left|
|-
|Win
|
|align=left| Max Baird
|KO
|2
|17/12/1954
|align=left| Birmingham, Alabama
|align=left|
|-
|Win
|
|align=left| Buddy Babcock
|UD
|4
|28/09/1954
|align=left| City Auditorium, Galveston, Texas
|align=left|
|}

References

 
Turman, Joe. Buddy: The Life of Texas Boxing Legend, Buddy Turman. Author's Website
"Buddy Turman: Still Fighting, Still Winning"
Colston, Chase. "Legend Who Shaped Boxing in Tyler Dies at 73." Tyler Morning Telegraph. 1D. Tyler, Texas. April 2, 2007. Online Version
Obituary. Tyler Morning Telegraph. Tyler, Texas. April 4, 2007. Online Version
FightNews - East Texas legend passes away

1933 births
2007 deaths
Boxers from Texas
Heavyweight boxers
American male boxers